The Dayton Convention Center is the primary public convention center in Dayton, Ohio, United States.

Located in downtown Dayton at 22 E. Fifth Street, the Dayton Convention Center is a 150,000 sq ft (14,000 m2) facility with 68,000 sq ft (7,150 m2) of exhibit space, a 672-seat theater, and 19 meeting rooms including a VIP lounge overlooking the exhibit halls.

History 
The Dayton Convention Center was built prior to 1973 on the intersection of Jefferson Street and Fifth Street in downtown Dayton. The Dayton Crowne Plaza along with the City of Dayton Transportation Bureau Parking Garage are connected to the Dayton Convention Center. After 27 years of operation, the City of Dayton City Commission approved a $2.5 million facade renovation which included a $350,000 LED marquee, a coffee shop, as well as its distinctive rotunda entrance.

In 2014, the Dayton Convention Center merged with the City of Dayton Department of Recreation and Youth Services. This merger allowed the Dayton Convention Center access to the Department of Recreation and Youth Services' programs including the three golf courses under ownership of the Department of Recreation and Youth Services: Community Golf Course, Kittyhawk Golf Course, and Madden Golf Course.

See also 
 List of Convention Centers in the United States
 Dayton, Ohio
 Dayton Metropolitan Area
1976 Dayton Pro Tennis Classic

References

External links 
 Official Website
 City of Dayton
 Dayton Convention and Visitor's Bureau
 City of Dayton Department of Recreation and Youth Services
 Community Golf Course
 Kittyhawk Golf Course
 Madden Golf Course

Convention centers in Ohio
Buildings and structures in Dayton, Ohio
Event venues established in 1979
1979 establishments in Ohio